Nisbet is a small hamlet on the B6400, in Roxburghshire, along the River Teviot, in the Scottish Borders area of Scotland.

The village has several Nisbet location names: Nisbet, East Nisbet, West Nisbet, Nisbetmill, Upper Nisbet, and Upper Nisbet Moor.  However, none of these are connected to the family of Nisbet of that Ilk, who built Nisbet House in Berwickshire.  There was a Nisbet family located a short distance from this Nisbet village at Cessford Burn from 1665 to 1822.

The Rev. Samuel Rutherford was born in the village of Nisbet about 1600.

See also
Nisbet House
List of places in the Scottish Borders

External links

A Hog-backed and two-coped monuments, in Nisbet graveyard
CANMORE/RCAHMS record for Nisbet, Old Churchyard
SCRAN image: Steel truss bridge, Nisbet, Roxburghshire
SCRAN image: Farm horsemen homeward bound at Nisbet Village, Roxburghshire, Scottish Borders
http://www.genuki.org.uk/big/sct/ROX/gazetteer/O.html GENUKI: Roxburghshire Gazetteer:)
Gazetteer for Scotland, Old County of Roxburghshire

Villages in the Scottish Borders